The King's Fifth (1966) is a children's historical novel by Scott O'Dell that was the inspiration for the cartoon TV series The Mysterious Cities of Gold. It describes, from the point of view of a teenage Spanish Conquistador, how the European search for gold in the New World of the Americas affected people's lives and minds. The title refers to the one fifth share of spoils expected by the Spanish Crown.

Plot summary
The story takes place in a time when the Spanish adventurers, known as Conquistadors, colonised the New World of the Americas, in search of the mythical gold treasures of the dethroned Native Americans.

Characters
 Estéban de Sandoval - a teenage mapmaker to the expedition to Cibola to find the gold
 Zia Troyano - a younger teenage Native American guide
 Captain Blas de Mendoza (very loosely based on Antonio de Mendoza) - an aristocrat in search of gold
 Father Francisco - a priest to the expedition who joined as a missionary and an explorer
 Roa and Zuñiga - part of a trio of musicians who are Mendoza's cronies

Adaptations

TV series
The book was the inspiration for the 1982-1983 French cartoon TV series "Les Mystérieuses Cités d'or (The Mysterious Cities of Gold). A few of the central characters take their names from the book, the high-level quest (searching for the Cities of Gold) is the same, and the "golden lake" scene from the book is also present in the cartoon, but the similarities end there (the cartoon has motifs of fantasy and science fiction).  The cartoon is set in South America, whereas the expedition in the book explores New Mexico and Arizona in North America.

Choose Your Own Adventure book
The book is also a slight influence in the Choose Your Own Adventure Time Machine's 1987 book Quest for the Cities of Gold, as the reader meets Esteban at different points.

Awards and nominations
Newbery Honor Book, 1967
Federal Republic of Germany Jugendbuchpreis, 1970

References

1966 American novels
1966 children's books
American children's novels
American novels adapted into television shows
Children's historical novels
Houghton Mifflin books
Newbery Honor-winning works
Novels set during the Conquest of the Americas
Novels set in California
Novels set in the 16th century
Spanish conquests in the Americas